The FasterCures Philanthropy Advisory Service (PAS) was first created as an online information resource for medical philanthropists. The goal of the web-based service is to accelerate drug and therapy development by increasing support and directing funds to high impact, nonprofit disease research organizations. It provides data about diseases and associated research organizations, allowing philanthropists to make informed investment decisions, match their interests to specific research organizations, and assess the outcome of their philanthropic investment.

In 2015, PAS spun out of FasterCures and became its own freestanding center at the Milken Institute, namely the Center for Strategic Philanthropy. The Milken Institute Center for Strategic Philanthropy conducts deep due diligence across a range of issue areas, promotes creative and well-informed giving strategies, and advises families and foundations on where and how to channel their philanthropy to maximize a return on their investment.

References
Adler, Neil. "FasterCures wins $35M grant from foundation." Washington Business Journal. April 25, 2007. Retrieved 2009 August 6. http://www.bizjournals.com/washington/stories/2007/04/23/daily33.html

"Partnering for Philanthropy Conference Launched to Unite Innovative Non-profit Research Organizations with Philanthropists and Industry." 2009 June 17. Retrieved 2009 August 1. http://www.prnewswire.com/cgi-bin/stories.pl?ACCT=PEHEA.story&STORY=/www/story/06-17-2008/0004833730&EDATE=TUE+Jun+17+2008,+08:30+AM

Simon, Greg. "Entrepreneurial Philanthropy and Innovative Medical Research: The Arthur C. Frantzreb Lecture at Indiana University’s Center on Philanthropy 19th Annual Symposium: 'Health and Philanthropy: Leveraging Change.'" Association for Research on Nonprofit Organizations and Voluntary Action. 2007. Retrieved 2009 August 1. nvs.sagepub.com/cgi/rapidpdf/0899764007310528v1.pdf

"Service Helps Philanthropists Make Informed Investment." Happy News. May 6, 2009. Retrieved 2009 August 1. http://www.happynews.com/news/562009/service%20helps%20philanthropists%20informed%20investment.htm

"FasterCures Launches Philanthropy Advisory Service: Service Helps Medical Research Philanthropists Make Informed Investment Decisions." April 28, 2009. Retrieved 2009 August 1. http://www.rwjf.org/pr/product.jsp?id=42112

"Helping Philanthropists Make Informed Investment Decisions." April 27, 2009. Retrieved 2009 August 1. http://www.fastercures.org/index.cfm/OurPrograms/Philanthropy_Advisory_Service

External links 
 

2015 establishments
Medical and health organizations based in California
Medical research organizations